Good Times is a free-circulation weekly newspaper based in Santa Cruz, California.  Good Times is distributed in Santa Cruz County, a coastal area that includes Capitola, Rio del Mar, Aptos and Watsonville. It is owned by the Northern California-based Metro Newspapers.  Dan Pulcrano is the CEO and executive editor.

History
Good Times was founded in 1975 by Jay Shore, who remained its owner/operator and editor for 13 years. Shore established Good Times amidst a proliferation in the 1970s of short-lived free counterculture newspapers in Santa Cruz County that included The Free Spaghetti Dinner, Sundaz!, Santa Cruz Times, People’s Press and the Santa Cruz Independent.

In 1988, Shore sold the paper to Independent Newspapers of New Zealand, part of Rupert Murdoch’s group of holdings, a year before much of downtown Santa Cruz was destroyed in the Loma Prieta earthquake.

In 1998, Independent Newspapers sold Good Times to Central Valley Publishing, later renamed Pacific-Sierra Publishing. In 2003, Pacific-Sierra head Anthony Allegretti lead a buyout to form a new company, MainStreet Media Group.

In 2014, New England-based Brookside Capital sold Good Times. to Metro Newspapers, which owned the competing Santa Cruz Weekly, returning the publication to local ownership for the first time since the 1980s. The Santa Cruz Weekly, which began as Metro Santa Cruz in 1994, combined operations with Good Times following the purchase.

On the eve of the sale, former Good Times publisher Ron Slack complained about the lack of investment in the product by its former owners, saying Good Times didn't get much support from its corporate parent in upgrades in equipment and software.

Good Times was an active sponsor with Tom Schot in presenting disc sports to Californians by way of the 1978 Santa Cruz Flying Disc Classic and the Santa Cruz Good Times Ultimate Team.

Good Times was the first publication to give voice to Rob Brezsny's "Free Will Astrology" Column.

On July 1, 2019, Good Times expanded its South County reach with the purchase of the Pulitzer Prize-winning Watsonville Register-Pajaronian, returning it to local control after 78 years of ownership by two multiple-state national media companies. It also acquired as part of the transaction the Aptos Life monthly.

Editorial Focus
Good Times publishes features  on news, opinion, entertainment, arts and events.

Originally, the publication started as a reaction to the political journalism of the 1970s and focused on entertainment. "Good Times’ motto was 'lighter than air.' They only printed good news," recalls former columnist Bruce Bratton.

Over time, the weekly has expanded its coverage and since 2000 has won more than 24 awards in editorial competitions.

General Excellence Awards

Good Times has won the state’s top award, General Excellence, in the California Newspaper Publishers Association’s California Journalism Awards (formerly “Better Newspaper Contest”) three times.

The first General Excellence award was in 2006–2007.

In 2018, it placed third in the state among California's largest weeklies for General Excellence.

In 2019 Good Times won the General Excellence First Place award, with judges praising the publication for its “excellent presentation, writing, story choices and quality of the photography” and noting, “The advertising was attractive and engaging.”

Good Times again received the state’s top award for weeklies in 2020. “Distinguished by its enterprise reporting,” contest judges commented.

Other Awards

 2008 Awards
 Environmental and agricultural reporting.
 2009 Awards
 Best Business Story, Elizabeth Limbach
 Best Photo Essay, Jeremiah Ridgeway 
 2011 Awards
 First Place, Best Writing, “Learning to Love Autism” (2011)  
 Best Writing, Hitting the Spot, Damon Orion
 2013 Awards
 Best Writing, “Breaking the Silence,” Elizabeth Limbach 
 2017 Awards
 Environmental Reporting: “Drought/Fire,” Honorable Mention, Kara Guzman	
 Profile Feature Story, Second Place, “Notes From the End of the World,” Steve Palopoli 
 2018 Awards
 Writing, Fourth Place, "Santa Cruz Goes Dark," Steve Palopoli	
 Agricultural Reporting	4th Place	Good Times	"In Harm's Spray"	Georgia Johnson	Good writing, strong local appeal
 Profile Story, Fifth Place, "Now You Are Free, "Steve Palopoli	
 Feature Story, Third Place, "A Tangled Future," Lauren Hepler, “a lengthy dive (no pun intended) on the issue of whale entrapment rescuing on the Monterey Bay... an admirable job weaving the topics together for an informative read.”
 Arts & Entertainment Coverage, Fourth Place, “The calendar listings are easy to navigate, but the use of color on the cover packages is over the top.”
 Sports Feature Story, Second Place
 Front Page Layout & Design, Third Place. “Great photography and illustrations with fun, tone-matched typography that isn't over the top. Very attractive work.” 
 2019 Awards
 Arts & Entertainment Coverage, Second Place. “Writing has spark and stories have community at the core. Attractive calendar with lots of photos and events.”
 Feature Story, Third Place, “Gonzo But Not Forgotten.” 
 Feature Story, Fourth Place, “Psychedelics Go Therapeutic.” 
 2020 Awards
 Weeklies: 25,001 & over, Profile Story, Third Place, "Music Without Borders"	Steve Palopoli
 Weeklies: 25,001 & over, Front Page Layout & Design, Second Place, “Excellent high-impact covers with true local focus and appeal. Nice work.” Kara Brown
 Weeklies: 25,001 & over, Coverage of Local Government, Second Place.	Jacob Pierce	
 Weeklies: all circulation categories. Wildfire Feature Coverage, Fifth Place. “Santa Cruz	Heroes or Hindrance? This story did a masterful job of taking readers to their neighborhoods during the fire to show what neighbors were doing to fight back—and what fire officials thought of their efforts. It raised important questions and gave those with different perspectives equal space to weigh in.” Jacob Pierce	
 Weeklies: 25,001 & over, Feature Story, Second Place “An amazing variety of features.”
 Weeklies: 25,001 & over, Feature Story, Third Place, “Lively writing that made me laugh out loud.” Steve Palopoli
 Weeklies: 25,001 & over, Wildfire News Coverage, Fourth Place. “Burned After Reading: 	A thoughtful take that provided context during the wildfires for local readers.” Jacob Pierce

References

External links
 

Newspapers published in the San Francisco Bay Area
Newspapers established in 1975
1975 establishments in California
Santa Cruz, California
Weekly newspapers published in California